Hi Vista is an unincorporated community in northeastern Los Angeles County, California, United States.

Geography
Hi Vista is located in the Antelope Valley, in the southwestern part of the Mojave Desert. This area is referred to as the "High Desert" due to its altitude.

Parks and recreation
Calvary Baptist Church in Hi Vista was used as a filming location for Quentin Tarantino's Kill Bill films, Vol. I & II (2003, 2004), as well as the music video for Road to Nowhere by Talking Heads.

Hi Vista is home to Saddleback Butte State Park, Butte Valley Wildflower Sanctuary, Phacelia Wildlife Sanctuary, and the "Kill Bill" church.

Education
Local students now attend Eastside High School in Lancaster, instead of Littlerock, which was over 30 miles away.

References

Unincorporated communities in Los Angeles County, California
Antelope Valley
Populated places in the Mojave Desert
Unincorporated communities in California